Highway 994 is a provincial highway in the far north region of the Canadian province of Saskatchewan. Highway 994 provides access to the isolated community of Kinoosao. Due to its geographic location, it is the only provincial highway in Saskatchewan that requires entering the neighbouring province of Manitoba to travel it. The route begins at the shores of Reindeer Lake in Kinoosao and heads eastward a short distance to the provincial line, where it continues eastward as Manitoba Provincial Road 394 towards Lynn Lake, Manitoba.

Route description
Highway 994 officially starts at the Manitoba/Saskatchewan border where Provincial Road 394 ends. About  from the border, Highway 994 passes through the community of Kinoosao. Highway 994 ends  later, on the shore of Reindeer Lake, as the means of access to the largest employer in the region, the fish processing plant.

Future
There were plans to build or replace a bridge along Highway 994 along Reindeer Lake in Kinoosao during the 2008-09 fiscal year.

Major intersections

See also
Roads in Saskatchewan
Transportation in Saskatchewan

References

994